is a Kōya-san Shingon temple in Awa, Tokushima Prefecture, Japan. Temple 9 on the Shikoku 88 temple pilgrimage, the main image is of Parinirvana Shaka Nyorai. The temple is said to have been founded by Kōbō Daishi, who carved the image.

See also

 Shikoku 88 temple pilgrimage

References

Buddhist pilgrimage sites in Japan
Buddhist temples in Tokushima Prefecture
Kōyasan Shingon temples